Kalow may refer to:
 Kalow, Afghanistan
 Kalow, East Azerbaijan (كالو), Iran
 Kalow, Dargaz (كالو), Razavi Khorasan Province, Iran
 Kalow, Kalat (كالو), Razavi Khorasan Province, Iran
 Kałów, Poland

See also

 Kalu (disambiguation)
 Kolu (disambiguation)
Karlow (name)